Upper Tor District (Indonesian: Distrik Tor Atas) is a district in Sarmi Regency, Papua, Indonesia.

Villages
As of 2019, Tor Atas District consists of 10 administrative villages (kampung). The indigenous Papuan languages spoken in each village are also listed below.

Bota-Bora (Berik language speakers)
Denander
Denender
Kanderjan (Berik language speakers)
Omte
Safrom Tane
Safron Tane (Berik language speakers)
Samanente (Berik language speakers)
Toganto (Berik language speakers)
Waaf (Berik language speakers)

References

Districts of Papua (province)